Huawei Nova 9 is a smartphone manufactured by Huawei. It was announced on September 23, 2021.

References 

Huawei smartphones
Mobile phones introduced in 2021